Nadeeka Guruge is one of the most influential composers in Sri Lankan music.

Biography
"I grew up with the guitar and the guitar speaks at this concert" says Nadeeka on his concerts titled Nostal Guitar Electrica 2015 and 'Echo in the Mountains'.

Guruge started as a young musician researching in 1999. His first serious musical work was "Sanyugma" a folk and applied music production with Marcello Titto Li, a Bolivian folk musician, in 1999. Since then he has been working in movies, tele dramas, stage dramas, songs and advertising.

Films

Sulanga Enu Pinisa 2005 
Sankara 2006 
Aba 2007
Karma 2010 – also as protagonist. 
Ira Handa Yata 2009
Nikini Vassa 2011 
The Kuveni 2011
Cindrella 2011
Gamani 2011 
Maharaja Gemunu 2015

Stage Dramas
Mal Nelanna Ba 1997
Gewan Naththan Bambu Gahannada (Mahesh Kumara) 2001
Master Harrold (Buddika Damayantha) 2003
Master Builder (Piyal Kaariyawasam) 2005
Sanda Langa Maranaya (Kaushalya Fernando) 2005
Rathnawalli (2006)

Teledramas
Sinidu Piyaapath (Geethika Palipana) 2003
Aga Pipi Mal (Sumithra Rahubaddha) 2004
Ranga Soba (Sumithra Rahubaddha) 2005
Rasthiyadukaraya (Lakmini Amaradeva) 2006
Kampitha Wil (Dr. Dharmasena Pathiraja) 2008
Ahi pillamak Yata (Pradeep Dharmadasa) 2009
Sihina Aran Enna (Niroshan Perera) 2011
Dhuli Pintharu (Santhusa Liyanage) 2012

References

External links
Nadeeka Guruge at the National Film Corporation Of Sri Lanka

20th-century Sri Lankan male singers
Sri Lankan composers
Living people
Sinhalese singers
Year of birth missing (living people)
21st-century Sri Lankan male singers